ArtScience is a studio album by American musician Robert Glasper. It was released on September 16, 2016 via Blue Note Records, his last one with that music label. Recording sessions took place at the Parior Recording Studio in New Orleans. Production was handled by Casey Benjamin, Derrick Hodge, Mark Colenburg and Glasper himself. It features contributions from Jahi Sundance on turntables and Mike Severson on guitar. The album peaked at number 129 on the US Billboard 200 albums chart.

Critical reception

ArtScience was met with generally favorable reviews from music critics. At Metacritic, which assigns a normalized rating out of 100 to reviews from mainstream publications, the album received an average score of 78 based on eight reviews.

AllMusic's Thom Jurek praised the album, stating that it is an "excellent step forward". Ryan B. Patrick of Exclaim! wrote: "at this point, Glasper, along with bassist Derrick Hodge, saxophonist Casey Benjamin, and drummer Mark Colenburg, are a well-oiled musical machine. As the Robert Glasper Experience, the quartet embrace jazz as they steer the genre into exciting directions". John Fordham of The Guardian wrote: "Glasper has signaled an impatience with jazz on earlier Experiment ventures, but very definitely not on this one". Marcus J. Moore of Pitchfork found the album "the Robert Glasper Experiment's most realized effort, mainly because they've stopped relying on outside talent to get their point across. They've created their own vibe, one that needed their own voices to truly resonate". Adriane Pontecorvo of PopMatters wrote: "an ingenious blend of soulful tunes and undeniable technique, ArtScience signals a bright, self-reliant future for the Robert Glasper Experiment".

Track listing

Personnel
Robert Glasper – keyboards (tracks: 1, 2, 4, 5, 7, 8, 10-12), piano (tracks: 1, 3-5, 7-12), Rhodes organ (tracks: 1, 3-9, 11, 12), vocals (tracks: 2, 11), producer
Casey Benjamin – vocals (tracks: 1, 3-6, 9, 10, 12), keyboards (tracks: 1, 2, 3, 5, 7, 9, 11, 12), alto saxophone (tracks: 1, 8, 9), vocoder (tracks: 4-6, 12), soprano saxophone (tracks: 4, 6, 9), backing vocals (track 7), producer
Derrick Hodge – bass, vocals (tracks: 1, 7), producer
Mark Colenburg – drums, vocals (track 1), percussion (tracks: 2, 3, 7), producer
Jahi Sundance – turntables (tracks: 1, 11), whistle (track 10)
Mike Severson – guitar (tracks: 4, 7, 9)
Riley Glasper – vocals (track 7)
Keith Lewis – engineering

Charts

References

External links

2016 albums
Robert Glasper albums
Blue Note Records albums
Jazz albums by American artists